{{Infobox organization
| name = Ladies' Gaelic Football AssociationCumann Peil Gael na mBan
| logo = Image:Cpnmb.jpg
| caption =  
| motto = 
| formation = 1974
| type = 
| headquarters = Westward HouseJones RoadDublin 3Ireland
| region_served = Republic of IrelandNorthern Ireland
| leader_title = President
| leader_name = Marie Hickey 
| main_organ = 
| parent_organization = Gaelic Athletic Association
| affiliations = 
| website =  ladiesgaelic.ie
}}

The Ladies' Gaelic Football Association''' is the main governing body for ladies' Gaelic football. It organises competitions such as the All-Ireland Senior Ladies' Football Championship and the Ladies' National Football League.

Foundation
The Ladies' Gaelic Football Association was founded on 18 July 1974 at a meeting held at the Hayes' Hotel in Thurles, County Tipperary, almost ninety years after the Gaelic Athletic Association was founded in the same hotel. Representatives from four counties – Offaly, Kerry, Tipperary and Galway – attended the meeting. In the same year the LGFA also organised the inaugural All-Ireland Senior Ladies' Football Championship. The LGFA was recognised by the Gaelic Athletic Association in 1982.

Competitions

All-Irelands
 All-Ireland Senior Ladies' Football Championship 
 All-Ireland Intermediate Ladies' Football Championship
 All-Ireland Junior Ladies' Football Championship
 All-Ireland Under-18 Ladies' Football Championship
 All-Ireland Under-16 Ladies' Football Championship 
 All-Ireland Under-14 Ladies' Football Championship
 All-Ireland Ladies' Club Football Championship

Leagues 
 Ladies' National Football League

Intervarsity 
 O'Connor Cup

Representative team
 Ireland women's international rules football team

References

Gaelic games governing bodies in Ireland
All-island sports governing bodies in Ireland
Ladies' Gaelic football
Gae
Sports organizations established in 1974
1974 establishments in Ireland